Lot 66 is a township in Kings County, Prince Edward Island, Canada.  It is part of St. George's Parish. Lot 66 was not distributed in the 1767 land lottery, but was reserved as demesne lands of the Crown.

References

66
Geography of Kings County, Prince Edward Island